Seasons of the Heart is the 16th studio album by American singer-songwriter John Denver released in February 1982. The singles released from this album are "Shanghai Breezes" / "What One Man Can Do" and "Seasons of the Heart."

The album cover is a self-portrait of Denver entering the Purple Cloud Cave in Hangzhou, China.

The singer-songwriter dedicated the album to his estranged wife, Annie, and the album was created as a love poem to her. They divorced the following year

Track listing
All tracks composed by John Denver; except where indicated

Side one

 "Seasons of the Heart" – 3:48
 "Opposite Tables" – 3:56
 "Relatively Speaking"  (Denver, lyrics: Arthur Hancock) – 3:33
 "Dreams"  (Stephen Geyer) – 3:02
 "Nothing But a Breeze"  (Jesse Winchester) – 4:45
 "What One Man Can Do" – 3:04

Side two

 "Shanghai Breezes" – 3:12
 "Islands" – 3:49
 "Heart to Heart" – 3:55
 "Perhaps Love" – 1:53
 "Children of the Universe"  (Denver, Joe Henry) – 4:05

Personnel
John Denver – vocals, guitar
Musicians: James Burton, Jerry Scheff, Glen Hardin, Jerry Carrigan, Jim Horn, Denice Brooks, Herb Pedersen, Renée Armand

Chart performance

References

John Denver albums
1982 albums
RCA Records albums